From 1986 through 2010, the Cohen Awards honored the best short story and poem published in the literary journal Ploughshares. The awards were sponsored by longtime Ploughshares patrons Denise and Mel Cohen. Finalists were nominated by staff editors, and the winners were selected by the advisory editors. Each winner received a cash prize of $600. The journal has since replaced the award with the Alice Hoffman Prize for Fiction.

Past winners

References

External links
Ploughshares Home page

American literary awards